Inga Saterlie Bernstein (born 1961) is a Massachusetts attorney in private practice and is a former nominee to be a United States district judge of the United States District Court for the District of Massachusetts.

Biography

Bernstein was born in 1961 in New Haven, Connecticut. She received her Bachelor of Arts magna cum laude from Wellesley College in 1984, after spending her junior year at the University of California, Berkeley and she received her Juris Doctor cum laude from Harvard Law School in 1994. she served as a law clerk to the Honorable Douglas P. Woodlock of the United States District Court for the District of Massachusetts from 1994 to 1995. Since 1995 Bernstein joined the firm Zalkind Duncan & Bernstein LLP in Boston, Massachusetts where she specializes in employment litigation and criminal law;  she was made a partner in 2001.

Failed nomination to district court

On July 30, 2015, President Obama nominated Bernstein to serve as a United States District Judge of the United States District Court for the District of Massachusetts, to the seat vacated by Judge Douglas P. Woodlock, who assumed senior status on June 1, 2015. She received a hearing before the United States Senate Judiciary Committee on April 20, 2016. On May 19, 2016 her nomination was reported out of committee by voice vote with Senator David Vitter voting 'No'. Her nomination expired on January 3, 2017, with the end of the 114th Congress.

See also
 Barack Obama judicial appointment controversies

References

1961 births
Living people
Harvard Law School alumni
Massachusetts lawyers
Lawyers from New Haven, Connecticut
Wellesley College alumni
American women lawyers
21st-century American women